Abu Talha may refer to:

Abu Talha, a village in northern Syria
Abu Talhah al Amrikee, or Zachary Adam Chesser (born 2001), BangladeshAmerican convicted in 2010 for aiding al-Shabaab, which is aligned with al-Qaeda and for threats to South Park creators Trey Parker and Matt Stone for depicting Muhammad in an episode of that series
Abu Talha al-Ansari, renowned companion of the Prophet Muḥammad and one of the Anṣār of Medina
Abu Talha Al-Almani or Denis Cuspert, also known as Deso Dogg (1975–2018), German former rapper and ISIL member